William Oldham may refer to:
William Kavanaugh Oldham (1865–1938), acting Democratic governor of the U.S. state of Arkansas, 1913
William Fitzjames Oldham (1854–1937), Indian-born British-American bishop and missionary
William Simpson Oldham, Sr. (1813–1868), politician in the Confederate States of America during the American Civil War
Will Oldham (born 1970), American singer, songwriter, and actor